Endophthora tylogramma is a species of moth in the family Tineidae. It was described by Edward Meyrick in 1924. This species is endemic to New Zealand.

References

Moths described in 1924
Tineidae
Moths of New Zealand
Endemic fauna of New Zealand
Taxa named by Edward Meyrick
Endemic moths of New Zealand